Kigonsera is a village in  the Ruvuma Region of southwestern Tanzania. It is located along the A19 road, to the northeast of Mbinga and to the southwest of Likonde.

References

External links
Maplandia
Populated places in Ruvuma Region